The English county of Berkshire has 252 Grade II* listed buildings.

Buildings

Bracknell Forest

|}

Reading

|}

Slough

|}

West Berkshire

|}

Windsor and Maidenhead

|}

Wokingham

|}

See also
 Grade I listed buildings in Berkshire

Notes

External links

 National Heritage List for England

 
Lists of listed buildings in Berkshire